Andrew Fenton (born 1952) is an Irish former sportsperson. He played hurling with his local club Kiltormer and was a member of the Galway senior inter-county team in the 1970s.

References

1952 births
Living people
Kiltormer hurlers
Galway inter-county hurlers
Connacht inter-provincial hurlers